Derek Bell  is Professor of Acute Medicine at Imperial College London.  Bell is the director of the National Institute for Health Research (NIHR) CLAHRC for Northwest London. He was President (2014 - 2020) of the Royal College of Physicians of Edinburgh, elected in November 2013 he took office on 1 March 2014 succeeding Neil Dewhurst. He was re-elected for a second term on 24 November 2016. He was awarded an OBE in the 2018 New Year Honours for services to Unscheduled Care and Quality Improvement.

He studied at the University of Edinburgh graduating in 1980, and was the UK's first Professor of Acute Medicine. He was elected as the inaugural President of the Society for Acute Medicine (SAM) in 2000, in 2013 he was awarded an Honorary Life Fellowship to SAM.

References

Academics of Imperial College London
Presidents of the Royal College of Physicians of Edinburgh
Alumni of the University of Edinburgh
Year of birth missing (living people)
Place of birth missing (living people)
Living people
Fellows of the Royal College of Physicians of Edinburgh
Officers of the Order of the British Empire
NIHR Senior Investigators